Marvin John Gudat (August 27, 1903 – March 1, 1954) was an American Major League Baseball outfielder for the Cincinnati Reds and Chicago Cubs. He attended UCLA. Gudat was inducted in the Pacific Coast League Hall of Fame in 2018.

References

External links

1903 births
1954 deaths
People from Goliad, Texas
Major League Baseball outfielders
Baseball players from Texas
Chicago Cubs players
Cincinnati Reds players
UCLA Bruins baseball players
Columbus Red Birds players
Dayton Aviators players
Hollywood Stars players
Houston Buffaloes players
Los Angeles Angels (minor league) players
Monroe Drillers players
Oakland Oaks (baseball) players
Peoria Tractors players
San Diego Padres (minor league) players
Topeka Jayhawks players